Non-Fiction is the second album from hip hop duo Black Sheep. It peaked at #107 on the Billboard 200.

The album featured two minor hip hop hits: "Without a Doubt" and "North, South, East, West." The Legion guest on the track "We Boys." The album failed to reach gold status, but it was a critical favorite by underground fans.

Track listing
All tracks produced by Black Sheep.

Samples
 "Autobiographical"
 "Kathleen's Theme" by Les McCann and Eddie Harris 
 "B.B.S."
 "Free Like The Wind" by Sonny Phillips
 "City Lights"
 "Get Out My Life, Woman" by Bill Cosby
 "I Wanna Know, Do You Feel It" by Ohio Players
 "Gotta Get Up"
 "Converge" by Chick Corea
 "Hundred & One Year/M'ria" by Cannonball Adderley
 "Freak Y'all"
 "Sugar" by Stanley Turrentine
 "Let's Get Cozy"
 "Roberta" by Les McCann
 "North, South, East, West"
 "Kool is Back" by Funk Inc.
 "Open Up Wide" by Chase
 "We Boys"
 "Broomstick" by Cannonball Adderley
 "Summer Song" by John Klemmer
 "Mace and Grenades" by Hugh Masekela
 "Who's Next"
 "Poobli" by Alphonse Mouzon
 "Without A Doubt"
 "The Sorcerer of Isis" by The Power of Zeus 
 "Sing a Simple Song" by Sly and the Family Stone
 "The Highways of My Life" by The Isley Brothers

Chart positions

Album

Singles

References

1994 albums
Mercury Records albums
Albums produced by Showbiz (producer)
Albums produced by Salaam Remi
Black Sheep (group) albums